Prabhakar Narayan alias Bhau Padhye (Devanagari: प्रभाकर नारायण उर्फ भाऊ पाध्ये; 1926–1996) was an Indian writer who wrote in Marathi. Padhye is regarded as one of the foremost writers to have emerged in not just modern Marathi literature but also  Indian literature, at large. Dilip Chitre once commented that Padhye is a writer "who deserves a permanent place in World Literature". 

During his lifetime, Padhye had a long ending tussle with publication of his books. Nevertheless, his novels Barrister Aniruddha Dhopeshvarkar, Vasunaka, Rada are regarded as classics of modern Marathi literature. Padhye was also known for his short stories. A collection of his short stories was edited by Dilip Chitre. Another collection of his selected short stories was edited by Rajan Gavas. 

His third published novel Vasunaka (Devanagari: वासूनाका) polarized critics in Maharashtra. Writers including Vijay Tendulkar, Durga Bhagwat hailed the novel for its originality and  its portrayal of humanism. On the other hand, critics like Acharya Atre shamed the novel for its vulgarity. 

Padhye graduated in Economics from the University of Mumbai in 1948. During 1949-51, he worked as a full-time volunteer for a labour union. He worked next as a teacher in King George High-school at Dadar, L. Kaduri High School at Mazgaon, and B. S. Ezikel High School at Sandhurst Road, all in Mumbai, for a year each. Then he worked for four years as a clerk in Spring Mill at Wadala in Mumbai before starting his career as a journalist, sequentially in Hind Mazdoor, Nava Kal, and Nava Shakti dailies.

His columns were published in different Marathi magazines, including Rahasyaranjan, Abhiruchee, Manoos, Sobat, Dinank, Kridangan, and Chandrayug.

In 1989, Padhye suffered an attack of paralysis.

He was married to Shoshna Mazgoankar , a labour union activist

Literary works

Novels
 Dombaryacha Khel, 1960, Majestic Book Stall, Mumbai
 Vaitag Vadi, 1965, Sadhana Prakashan, Pune
 Vasunaka, 1965, Popular Prakashan, Mumbai
 Barrister Aniruddha Dhopeshvarkar, 1968, Popular Prakashan, Mumbai
 Agresar, 1968, G. M. Prabhu Prakashan, Mumbai
 Homesick Brigade, 1974, Amey Prakashan, Nagpur
 Rada, 1975, Forward Publication, Mumbai
 Vanava, 1978, Indraneel Prakashan, Mumbai
 Ward No. 7 Surgical, 1980, Dimple Publication, Vasai
 Karanta, 1981, Majestic Prakashan
 Jailbirds, 1982, Dimple Publication, Vasai

Story collections
 Ek Sunehara Khwab, 1980, Dhaara Prakashan, Aurangabad
 Murgi, 1981, Dimple Publication, Vasai
 Thalipeeth, 1984, Dimple Publication, Vasai
 Thodisi Jo Pee Le, 1986, Saras Prakashan, Vasai
 Bhau Padhye Yanchya Shreshth Katha, 2009, edited by Dilip Purushottam Chitre, Lokvangmay Griha, Mumbai

Play
 Operation Chhakka, 1969

Movie script
 Godam (1984). (Directed by Dilip Chitre, the movie received in 1985 a Special Jury Award for direction at The France International Film Festival.)

Other writings
 Pichakari, 1979, Dinapushpa Prakashan, Mumbai
 Sajati Hai Yun Hi Mehefil, 1981
 Gurudatt, 1990, Lokvangmaya Griha, Mumbai

Literary accolades
 Maharashtra State Award for the novel Vaitag Vadi (1965)
 Lalit Award for Barrister Aniruddha Dhopeshwarkar (1968)
 Maharashtra State Literature and Culture Board Fellowship (1993)

References

External links
 A blog about Bhau Padhye
 BHAU PADHYE—the unsung 'voice' of Mumbai
 Note on Bhau Padhye at Beyond The Letters blog
 Barrister Aniruddha Dhopeshwarkar at Beyond The Letters blog

1926 births
1996 deaths
Journalists from Maharashtra
Marathi-language writers
University of Mumbai alumni
Writers from Mumbai
20th-century Indian novelists
20th-century Indian short story writers
20th-century Indian dramatists and playwrights
20th-century Indian journalists
Indian newspaper journalists
Novelists from Maharashtra